Rānui is a suburb of Porirua City approximately  north of Wellington in New Zealand. Rānui means midday in the Māori language.

Demography

Rānui had a population of 3,561 at the 2018 New Zealand census, an increase of 114 people (3.3%) since the 2013 census, and an increase of 84 people (2.4%) since the 2006 census. There were 1,146 households. There were 1,743 males and 1,821 females, giving a sex ratio of 0.96 males per female, with 780 people (21.9%) aged under 15 years, 858 (24.1%) aged 15 to 29, 1,554 (43.6%) aged 30 to 64, and 369 (10.4%) aged 65 or older.

Ethnicities were 47.7% European/Pākehā, 28.6% Māori, 37.7% Pacific peoples, 11.3% Asian, and 2.3% other ethnicities (totals add to more than 100% since people could identify with multiple ethnicities).

The proportion of people born overseas was 22.4%, compared with 27.1% nationally.

Although some people objected to giving their religion, 39.5% had no religion, 46.7% were Christian, 1.7% were Hindu, 1.9% were Muslim, 1.0% were Buddhist and 2.5% had other religions.

Of those at least 15 years old, 426 (15.3%) people had a bachelor or higher degree, and 618 (22.2%) people had no formal qualifications. The employment status of those at least 15 was that 1,422 (51.1%) people were employed full-time, 348 (12.5%) were part-time, and 177 (6.4%) were unemployed.

Education

References 

Suburbs of Porirua